MMH may refer to:

 Monomethylhydrazine, CH3N2H3, a chemical
 Mammoth Yosemite Airport. IATA code
 Mackay Memorial Hospital, Taipei, Taiwan
 Multilinear Modular Hashing, a computer algorithm
 Manual material handling
 Mark McHugh, a Gaelic footballer
 Martin McHugh (Gaelic footballer), a Gaelic footballer